Kurt Geinzer (born 3 July 1948) is a retired German football defender and later manager.

References

1948 births
Living people
German footballers
SpVgg Bayreuth players
1. FC Nürnberg players
Kickers Offenbach players
Association football defenders
2. Bundesliga players
German football managers
Kickers Offenbach managers
Viktoria Aschaffenburg managers
Sportspeople from Erlangen
Footballers from Bavaria